The Avro 641 Commodore was a British single-engine five-seat cabin biplane built by Avro in the mid-1930s for private use. A total of only six were built, including the prototype.

Design and development
After building the three seat Avro 639 Cabin Cadet, Avro then designed a larger, five seat cabin biplane, the Avro 641 Commodore. The Commodore had a similar steel tube structure to the Tutor, with heavily staggered single bay wings and a spatted undercarriage. The first Commodore was delivered to its owner on 24 May 1934.

Operational history
Only six Commodores were built, with one being sold to the Maharajah of Vizianagram. This was found to be unsuitable for Indian conditions and was returned to Britain and scrapped. Two were sold to private owners in Egypt and were later taken over by the Egyptian Army Air Force.

The two Commodores that remained in service in England on the outbreak of World War II were impressed into service with the Royal Air Force and the Air Transport Auxiliary. One crashed fatally in 1941, with the last being struck off charge in 1942.

Operators

Egyptian Army Air Force

Air Transport Auxiliary
Royal Air Force

Specifications (Commodore)

See also

References

1930s British civil utility aircraft
Commodore
Single-engined tractor aircraft
Biplanes
Aircraft first flown in 1934